Bhabra or Bhabhra is an ethno-linguistic and religious group who are from Punjab region which follow Jainism.

History and Origin
The Bhabra community has had a close historical association with Jainism. It is believed to be connected with the Bhavadar or Bhavada Gachchha  to which the legendary Jain Acharya Kalakacharya belonged to. They may have originated from the Bhabra town (32° 13' 30": 73° 13'). Inscriptions suggest that Bhavada Gachchha  had survived until the 17th century.

Jainism has been present in Punjab since ancient times. This is where Alexander the Great encountered Gymnosophists and Xuanzang met both Digambara and Swetambara monks.
According to Shatrunjaya Mahatmya of Dhaneshwar Suri, Javad Shah of Taxila had restored Shatrunjaya Tirth and brought an idol of Lord Adinath from Taxila and installed it at Shatrunjaya.

Vaar 8 Pauri 12 of 24 of Vaaran Bhai Gurdas (1550-1620 CE) says: "kaytarhiaan hee baaneeay kitarhay bhaabharhiaan suniaaray", there are many traders and many  Bhabras are goldsmiths.

In "Romantic Tales from the Punjab" Charles Swynnerton relates a folk tale about several girls. It mentions a girl being a Bhabra, and mentions them being strictly vegetarian. In the 17th century, Fray Sebastien Manrique met them in Amritsar district. Their presence has been noted in the Mughal period, and in the 19th century.

The original home region of the Bhabras is now in Pakistan. While all the Bhabras left Pakistani Punjab in 1947, for India. Many cities still have sections named after Bhabras.

 Sialkot: All the Jains here were Bhabra and mainly lived in Sialkot and Pasrur. The Serai Bhabrian and  Bhabrian Wala localities are named after them. There were several Jain temples here before partition of India.
 Pasrur: Pasrur was developed by a Jain zamindar who was granted land by Raja Maan Singh. Baba Dharam Dass belonged to the zamindar family who was murdered on a trading visit.
 Gujranwala: Two old Jain libraries managed by Lala Karam Chand Bhabra were present here which were visited by Ramkrishna Gopal Bhandarkar
 Lahore: There were Jain temples at localities still called Thari Bhabrian and  Gali Bhabrian.
 Rawalpindi: Bhabra Bazar is named after them.

In India they have been present at:

 Amritsar: Kucha Bhabrian, Katra Bhabrian
 Hansi: Mohalla bhabran

After 1947 Partition, most of displaced bhabra families were resettled in Ludhiana, Punjab and Ambala, Haryana. 

In Delhi, the majority of Jains in Rup Nagar locality also have their origin in west Punjab.

References

Punjabi tribes
Jain communities
Social groups of Punjab, India
Jainism in Pakistan